Kelly de Almeida Afonso Freitas (born March 3, 1983), known for her stage name Kelly Key, is a Brazilian pop singer, songwriter and TV hostess.

Biography

2001–04: Debut album, Do Meu Jeito and live album

Key released her first, self-titled album in 2001 at the age of 17. Her first single was the song "Escondido" ("Hidden") in which she sang the suggestive lyrics 'We went out to make out and to make love'. The song received much airplay thanks to her then-boyfriend, Brazilian funk singer Latino, who she had dated for years, and the risqué lyrics.

Her big breakthrough was the song "Baba" ("Drool") which was the biggest hit in the country during 2001 and 2002. In the controversial song and music video, Kelly provokes an older man that ignored her when she was young and infatuated with him, but now that she's older, is sexually attracted to her. Thanks to the success of the song, the album went 2× platinum in Brazil and selling over 500.000 copies. In 2002 was released to international markets. Furthermore, Key's first two singles comprised highly explicit sexual content; although, the albums appealed predominantly to minors. The album would later tender two more successful singles: Cachorrinho ("Little Dog"), about a petulant man and his eventual apprehension of the reality of his relationship with his female boss, and "Anjo" ("Angel"), a sad ballad. Both songs received major airplay and were big radio hits.

She spawned a doll, a shoes line and many other products targeted at young girls during her early years. In the same year, Kelly received substantial exposure after appearing on the covers of various gossip magazines due to her divorce with Latino, which did not end amicably, and participation in a recent Playboy exposé. In 2002 was released Kelly Key en Español, a Spanish version of the debut album only in Latin America, selling a 50,000 copies, and also was released Remix Hits, a remix album for the LGBT clubs, selling 100,000 copies worldwide. On 2003 saw the release of Key's second album Do Meu Jeito (en: My Way). Following "Baba"'s legacy, the album's first single, "Adoleta", recited Key's difficult relationship with a younger man. Key also released "Chic Chic", song about the fame. The album sold 300,000 copies in Brazil.

2005–09: Kelly Key, Por Que Não? and music hiatus

In 2005, after changing the writers and producers of her first works, Key went through a transformation to her third studio album, Kelly Key 2005 which featured teen pop songs. The album featured the hits "Escuta Aqui, Rapaz" ("Listen, Boy") and a remake of Aqua's 1997 hit "Barbie Girl", selling about 100,000 copies in Brazil. In 2006 she released her last album on the Warner Music label, Por Que Não? (English: Why Not?), selling 45,000 copies. The album spawned the hits "Pegue e Puxe" ("Reach and Pull"), "Shake Boom" and "Analista" ("Analyst").

In 2007 Key released her first compilation, 100% Kelly Key, by Som Livre Records, her new label, selling 50,000 copies. The album released the smash "Você é o Cara" ("You're the Dude"), reaching her seventh number one single in Brazil. In 2008 Key released her fifth studio album Kelly Key, rescuing adult themes and selling 40,000 copies. In 2009 Key left Som Livre Records to become a presenter.

2010–present: Television career and No Controle

In 2009 she became host of the Rede Record's TV show Hoje em Dia with other presenters. In 2010, she became host of her own TV show, the Game Show de Verão. In 2011 she returned to music and released her first house music single, "O Problema é Meu" ("The Problem is Mine"), which featured DJ and producer Mister Jam. On November 15, she released her debut English single, "Shaking (Party People).

In 2014 Kelly announced return to the stage; the single "Controle" marked her return to music after five years dedicating herself exclusively to television. On February 3, 2015, the singer released her sixth studio album , which features a sound inspired by the rhythms kizomba, zouk and electronic music.

Philanthropy and other activities
Key has a great success with the LGBT people in Brazil, and she supports same-sex marriage in the country. She was a spokesperson to high-school age young adults in a campaign in which she said, "Show how you've grown up. This Carnaval, use condoms."

Kelly Key became a friend and business partner of singer and digital influencer Clei Ribeiro and shares videos with audios by Clei Ribeiro to entertain fans.

Discography 

 2001: Kelly Key
 2002: En Español
 2003: Do Meu Jeito
 2004: Kelly Key - Ao Vivo
 2005: Pra Brilhar
 2006: Por Que Não?
 2008: Kelly Key
 2015: No Controle
 2020: Do Jeito Delas

Tours 

 2001–03: Turnê Kelly Key" (247 concerts – In Brazil)
 2003–04: Turnê Ao Vivo e do Meu Jeito (118 concerts in Brazil)
 2005:  Turnê O Filme Já Começou"
 2006:  Turnê Por que Não? (46 in Brazil)
 2008–09: 100% Tour (90 concerts in Brazil)
 2010: Holiday Tour (7 concerts – Brazil)
 2011–13: In The Night/Shaking Tour (43 concerts – Brazil)
 2015–present: Turnê No Controle (19 concerts – Brazil)

Filmography

References

External links 

Official Website
Her Blog

1983 births
Living people
People from Rio de Janeiro (city)
Brazilian people of Portuguese descent
Brazilian women pop singers
English-language singers from Brazil
Spanish-language singers of Brazil
Feminist musicians
Brazilian LGBT rights activists
21st-century Brazilian singers
21st-century Brazilian women singers